Mallu Magalhães (born 1992) is a Brazilian singer, songwriter and musician.

Mallu Magalhães may also refer to:
                                       
Mallu Magalhães (2008 album)
Mallu Magalhães (2009 album)
Mallu Magalhães (DVD), 2008